Benson is an unincorporated community in Howard County, Maryland, United States.

References

Unincorporated communities in Howard County, Maryland
Unincorporated communities in Maryland